Izaack Jacob Powell (born 12 February 2002) is an Australian professional footballer who played as a left back for Brisbane Roar.

Career

Brisbane Roar
Powell was part of the 2018-19 Y-League championship winning Brisbane Roar Youth team. He started and played the full 90 minutes as the Young Roar beat Western Sydney Wanderers Youth 3–1 in the 2019 Y-League Grand Final on 1 February 2019.

Powell made his professional debut for Brisbane Roar in a 2–1 win against Sydney FC on 8 February 2019 at the age of 16 years, 11 months and 28 days. In doing so he became the youngest player to play for the club. On 4 March 2019 after 2 senior A-League appearances, Powell signed a one-year scholarship deal with Brisbane Roar.

In June 2021, Powell was diagnosed with leukemia and he revealed it four months later. His contract with Brisbane Roar had expired at the end of the 2020–21 A-League season, but the club will offer him a new contract when he is ready to return.

International career
On 2 October 2019, Powell was selected in the Joeys squad for the 2019 FIFA U-17 World Cup. He started in all of the Joeys' Group B games, providing an assist for Noah Botic's goal in their 2–1 loss to Ecuador. He started in their Round of 16 clash with France on 7 November 2019, losing 4-0 and being eliminated from the competition.

Honours
Brisbane Roar
Y-League: 2018–19

References

External links

2002 births
Living people
Australian soccer players
Association football defenders
Brisbane Roar FC players
National Premier Leagues players
A-League Men players